A Fonsagrada is a town and municipality in the province of Lugo in the autonomous community of  Galicia in northwest Spain which is 25 miles east-north-east of Lugo by road. Its population in 2004 was  5,007. Historically it was an important market for a variety of agricultural produce, and it manufactured linen and frieze for local trading.

The history of Fonsagrada (traditional name) is linked to the pilgrim Camino de Santiago. A variant of the Way, the Camino Primitivo, (the original path) goes through the municipality.

History

The City Council of Burón was composed of the existing councils of Fonsagrada and Negueira de Muñiz. Subsequently, the council Negueira de Muñiz separated from Fonsagrada. In 1943 the provincial council elected its mayor Benjamin Alvarez Fernandez to the position of prosecutor in courts in the First Legislature of the Spanish Courts (1943-1946), representing the municipalities of this province.

Camino primitivo

The "primitive way" to Santiago refers to a stretch between Oviedo and Palas de Rei.  It enters Galicia through Fonsagrada, among whose landmarks is the "New Royal Hospital of Santiago de Montouto", a half-ruined building, which was used by pilgrims. This hospital has its origin in the "Old Royal Hospital of Santiago de Montouto", founded by Pedro I "The cruel". The hospital gives its name to a local mountain range, the "Serra do Hospital".

Carnivals and festivals
A Fonsagrada and its villages has a particular tradition of celebrating carnival or Antroido. During the festivals the lights are turned off and turn on torches (called locally in Galician "fachas") and the people leave for a pilgrimage.

Also to note is the "Feria de septiembre," or "September Fair" in English, one of the largest and most traditional livestock festivals across the province of Lugo. However, due to the abandonment of many small farms in nearby villages, its importance was lost in the late 20th century.

The "Feria del emigrantes," or "Fair of Emigrants" in English, is held in early or mid-August and has replaced the importance of the "Feria de septiembre." It is celebrated as a reunion with those that left and never came back but return to the area for vacations.

The Day of Galicia, 25 July, is held next to the "New Royal Hospital of Santiago de Montouto" in the parish of Padrón. It is held in a chapel that was recently built in for a procession in honor of St. James.

Vegetation
Almost the entire region, except a few villages, is located in mountainous areas, so the vegetation is relatively poor. The region has Atlantic mountain characteristics with an influence of Mediterranean characteristics as well. The region has not registered any type oak nor orange tree.

Highlighting the pine (after a repopulation), the native black pine is considered extinct in the region.

Civil parishes

Wildlife
Wildlife includes the rare Kerry slug.

References

Municipalities in the Province of Lugo